Robert H. Homer (May 16, 1849 – October 13, 1927) was an American politician who served in Wyoming's Territorial legislature as a Democrat.

Life

Robert H. Homer was born in Boston, Massachusetts to Peter Thatcher Homer and Caroline Bunker on May 16, 1849. He went to public schools and then entered the dry good business from 1868 to 1871. In 1871 he visited France during the Franco-Prussian War and after returning from Europe moved to the Wyoming Territory. In 1874 he helped found the Laramie National Bank and served as its director until 1893 and then worked for the Wyoming National Bank in Laramie until 1895. In 1901 he became president of the Albany County National Bank and served until his death.

From 1877 to 1879 he serve in the Wyoming Territorial Legislature and again in 1883. In 1892 he represented Wyoming on the Notification Committee at the Democratic National Convention.

On February 26, 1888, he married Belle Stuart White in Providence, Rhode Island. In 1900 he served as a national commissioner at the Paris World's Fair. In 1904 he was appointed by Governor DeForest Richards onto a commission for Wyoming's exhibit to the 1904 World's Fair and was later elected as president of the commission.

On October 13, 1927, he died in San Diego, California.

References

External links

1849 births
1927 deaths
19th-century American politicians
Politicians from Boston
Members of the Wyoming Territorial Legislature
Wyoming Democrats